Calocosmus semimarginatus is a species of beetle in the family Cerambycidae. It was described by Bates in 1881. It is known from Cuba.

References

Calocosmus
Beetles described in 1881
Endemic fauna of Cuba